Tomás Mannion (born 1 October 1969) is an Irish former Gaelic footballer who played for the Galway county team.

Playing career
Mannion first represented Galway at minor level. Mannion was at corner forward in the final of the  1986 All-Ireland Minor Football Championship, scoring two goals in the win over Cork.

Mannion was corner back on the Galway team that won the All-Ireland in 1998, beating Kildare. Mannion was named on the All Star team later that year. After retiring due to a back injury, missing the 2000 championship, Mannion returned to the Galway team for the 2001 season. Later that year, Mannion was at centre back for the All-Ireland final against Meath. Galway were nine-point winners, giving Mannion his second All-Ireland medal. Mannion retired from inter-county football after the 2002 season.

Honours
Galway
 All-Ireland Senior Football Championship (2): 1998, 2001
 Connacht Senior Football Championship (5): 1995, 1998, 2002
 All-Ireland Minor Football Championship (1): 1986
 Connacht Minor Football Championship (1): 1986

Monivea Abbey
 Galway Senior Football Championship (1): 1992

Abbeyknockmoy
 Galway Senior Hurling Championship (1): 1988

Individual
 All Star Award (1): 1998

References

1969 births
Living people
Galway inter-county Gaelic footballers
Monivea Abbey Gaelic footballers
Abbeyknockmoy hurlers
Winners of two All-Ireland medals (Gaelic football)